Gorka Gerrikagoitia Arrien (born 7 December 1973 in Guernica) is a Spanish former professional cyclist who spent his entire career on .

Palmares
1996
3rd Memorial Rodriguez Iguanzo
1997
1st Clásica Memorial Txuma
2003
3rd Prueba Villafranca de Ordizia
6th Clasica San Sebastian

Grand Tour general classification results timeline

References

1973 births
Living people
Spanish male cyclists
People from Guernica
Sportspeople from Biscay
Cyclists from the Basque Country (autonomous community)